"Fatal Attractions" is a major X-Men crossover written by Fabian Nicieza and Scott Lobdell, published by Marvel Comics in 1993. Spanning the entire line of books, it served to commemorate the 30th anniversary of Marvel's X-Men.

When Magneto and his Acolytes return, a new confrontation with the X-Men begins, with Professor Xavier tempted to cross a moral line to stop them.

Plot summary
The Acolytes, now led by Fabian Cortez, attack Camp Hayden, the headquarters for Project: Wideawake, the latest government Sentinel program. The base is defended by government-sponsored mutant team X-Factor, and as the battle rages Cortez makes an offer to Quicksilver to be the Acolyte's new leader, accepting his role as Magneto's heir. The Acolytes leave after Quicksilver strongly declines.

X-Force is approached by the mutant Exodus, who brings an offer of sanctuary from an unknown greater power. It is revealed that the "sanctuary" (which is referred to as Avalon) is in fact Cable's former base of operations Graymalkin (now retrofitted with Shiar technology), and the "greater power" to be the mutant Magneto, who was presumed dead after the fall of Asteroid M. Cable teleports X-Force away from Avalon using the station's bodyslide technology, while he retrieves the sentient computer program Professor from the central core and activate the auto-destruct function. However, he is only successful in the former objective, as Magneto prevents him from fulfilling the latter, and Cable very nearly loses his life in a lopsided battle before teleporting himself out. The mutants Rusty and Skids, who were cured of their brainwashing at Stryfe's hands by Magneto, elect to stay aboard Avalon.

While the X-Men are burying Illyana Rasputin (who was killed by the Legacy Virus), Magneto and the Acolytes crash the funeral, stating their intentions to wipe out humanity from Avalon, their space station. Colossus, distraught over his sister's death and faltering in his faith in Professor X and his dream, joins Magneto and the Acolytes.

The UN Security Council activates the Magneto Protocols, which uses a network of satellites to create a barrier around the planet that will prevent Magneto from using his powers from within. Magneto retaliates by unleashing an electromagnetic pulse on the Earth that creates havoc on the world's electrical systems. Professor X dons a Shi'ar exoskeleton that enables him to walk, and assembles Jean Grey, Gambit, Rogue, Quicksilver and Wolverine to go to Avalon and stop Magneto. Arriving via Shi'ar teleportation device, the team boards Avalon and disables the station with a virus created by Beast. Magneto engages the X-Men in battle, and in a fit of rage after nearly being gutted by Wolverine, tears the adamantium out of Wolverine's skeleton. Professor X, enraged by Magneto's actions, mindwipes Magneto, leaving him in a coma. The X-Men race back to Earth to treat Wolverine, while Colossus stays in a devastated Avalon to care for the comatose Magneto.

As the Blackbird returns to Earth, it runs into rough turbulence. Flashes of Wolverine's consciousness are shown as he struggles to stay alive. The X-Men on Earth watch in horror as the crew frantically tries to stabilize the ship and care for Wolverine. The ship's hatch opens, and Wolverine sees himself "going towards the light", but he is pushed back. He awakens in time to prevent Jean Grey from getting sucked out of the Blackbird. The X-Men land on the Earth safely. As Wolverine recovers from his injuries, he and the X-Men learn that his claws were a part of his actual skeletal structure all along, as he now possesses claws made of bone.

On Muir Island, the X-Men use Shadowcat to lure in Colossus in an effort to heal his head wound (caused by the X-Cutioner), which they believed was responsible for his defection. The ruse works, and while Nightcrawler fends off the Acolytes' attempts to reclaim their ally, Professor X and Moira MacTaggert heal Colossus, using Cyclops' optic blast. Once again able to return to his human form, Colossus still elects to remain amongst the Acolytes, to keep them in check.

Aftermath
 This story leads directly into the Avengers/X-Men crossover "Bloodties".
 In wiping out Magneto's mind, Professor X unleashes an evil psychic entity, Onslaught, that festers in his own mind, leading to the Onslaught Saga of 1996.
 The mind-wiped Magneto did not return until 1997 in Uncanny X-Men #350.
 Wolverine lost his adamantium skeleton (and subsequently left the X-Men). He did not get it back until 1999, when Apocalypse rebonded it to his skeleton, shown through flashback sequences during Wolverine (vol. 2) #145. Genesis had attempted the same earlier, but did not succeed (during Wolverine (vol. 2) #99-#100).
 With the team in shambles, the three remaining members of Excalibur (Nightcrawler, Shadowcat, and Phoenix) decide to remain on Muir Island, abandoning their operations in Britain.
 After the destruction of Avalon, Colossus would later join Excalibur as part of his rehabilitation.
 According to Peter David, the idea of Magneto pulling out Wolverine's adamantium came from the plotting of the X-Cutioner's Song crossover. He had sarcastically suggested the removal when they were considering bringing Magneto back, and supposedly it was never meant to be taken seriously.
 Nicieza returned to this story in honor of the X-Men's 50th anniversary in the special anthology comic X-Men: Gold #1 (2013). In this short story, we see that while he was erasing Magneto's mind, Xavier gave him a final vision of a utopia that could have come to pass if the two of them had worked together.

Tie-in issues
X-Factor #92
X-Force #25
Uncanny X-Men #304
X-Men (vol. 2) #25
Wolverine (vol. 2) #75
Excalibur #71

Reception
Initial installments of "Fatal Attractions" sold higher than the issues of the participating series which preceded them, but noticeably less than previous X-Men crossovers. Wizard magazine speculated that this was due to fan disappointment with recent X-Men crossovers, such as X-Cutioner's Song.

In other media
 Several elements of the Fatal Attractions storyline were influenced in the X-Men animated series. In the two-part episode "Sanctuary", Magneto creates Asteroid M, a human-free orbiting space station, though it was only Cortez who desired to use its weaponry to attack humans.
 Fatal Attractions was loosely adapted into a video game entitled X-Men: Children of the Atom in 1994. Much like the comic book storyline, Magneto plans to unleash an electromagnetic pulse on the Earth that will disrupt the magnetic fields and create havoc on the world's electrical systems, ushering in a Dark Age for the Earth's non-mutant population. Unlike the storyline, where Magneto has the Acolytes on his side, Omega Red, the Sentinels, Silver Samurai, Spiral, and the Juggernaut joins forces with Magneto as he promises a mutant run planet.
 In the 2003 video game X2: Wolverine's Revenge (whose storyline has more connections to the Marvel Universe than to X2), the events of Fatal Attractions are briefly mentioned during the confrontation between Magneto and Wolverine, with Wolverine reminding the former he didn't forget when Magneto ripped the adamantium out of Wolverine's body.

Collected editions
The story has been collected into a trade paperback
 X-Men: Fatal Attractions  (January 1995)

The story has been collected into an Omnibus hardcover
 X-Men: Fatal Attractions  (816 pages, April 2012)
Collecting: Uncanny X-Men 298-305, 315, Annual 17; X-Factor 87-92; X-Men Unlimited 1-2; X-Force 25; X-Men 25; Wolverine 75; Excalibur 71

References